In June 2016, England played a three-test series against  as part of the 2016 mid-year rugby union tests. They played the Wallabies across the three weeks of the June International window, 11 June–25 June, and contested the Cook Cup, which England had previously won eight times to Australia's twelve. The series was part of the fourth year of the global rugby calendar established by the International Rugby Board, which runs through to 2019.

England won all three matches—the first time it had won a test series in Australia. After defeating the hosts in the second match, England retained the Cook Cup and achieved second place in the World Rugby Rankings, demoting Australia to fourth. Australia had not lost every match in a home series since being "whitewashed" by South Africa in 1971.

The Australian media joked about the England rugby team after the third test as the United Kingdom had voted to leave the European Union just two days earlier.

Fixtures

Squads
Note: Ages, caps and clubs are as per 11 June, the first test match of the tour.

England
On 22 May, Eddie Jones named a 32-man squad for England's tour of Australia. An additional 5 players (Dave Attwood, Luther Burrell, Ollie Devoto, Matt Kvesic, Tommy Taylor) were also named ahead of the test match against Wales on 29 May, the day after the Aviva Premiership final between Saracens and Exeter Chiefs. Ben Te'o, whose mother is English, was named in the squad, despite playing for Irish province Leinster, since he will be moving to Worcester Warriors for the 2016/17 season, making him eligible for selection.

On 30 May, Luther Burrell replaced Manu Tuilagi in the touring squad after Tuilagi withdrew from the squad due to injury.

Coaching team:
 Head coach:  Eddie Jones
 Defence coach:  Paul Gustard
 Attack/Skills coach:  Glen Ella
 Forwards coach:  Steve Borthwick

Australia
On 26 May 2016, Michael Cheika named a 39-man extended squad for their June test series against England.

On 30 May 2016, Reece Hodge was called up to the squad to replace the injured Mike Harris.

On 3 June 2016, Michael Cheika named a final 33-man squad for the test series, with Adam Coleman, Liam Gill, James Hanson, Leroy Houston, Eto Nabuli and Joe Powell missing out on the final cut.

On 12 June, Matt To'omua joined the squad as un-listed member of the squad after recovering from his knee surgery. Liam Gill (rugby)|Liam Gill also joined the squad after David Pocock was ruled out of the rest of the series.

On 20 June, Ben McCalman was ruled out of the last test of the series due to injury and was replaced by Leroy Houston in the squad.

On 23 June, Adam Coleman was named in an extended match-day 23 for the final test, despite not being in the initial 33-man squad.

Coaching team:
 Head coach:  Michael Cheika
 Defence coach:  Nathan Grey
 Forwards coach:  Mario Ledesma
 Backs/Attack coach:  Stephen Larkham

Matches

First test

Notes:
 Rory Arnold, Nick Frisby, Samu Kerevi and Dane Haylett-Petty (all Australia) made their international debuts.
 Mike Brown (England) earned his 50th test cap.
 England win back-to-back tests in Australia for the first time since 2003, while winning in Brisbane for the first time ever.
 The 39 points scored by England, are the most points scored by England against Australia.

Second test

Notes:
 Chris Robshaw (England) earned his 50th test cap, having started all of his appearances.
 The 16 points England won by is the most they have ever beaten Australia by in Australia, breaking the record of 11 points they set the previous week.
 England retain the Cook Cup for the third consecutive time.
 England win their first ever test series against Australia.
 England win their third consecutive match against Australia in Australia, the first time they have done this.

Third test

Notes:
 Adam Coleman (Australia) made his international debut.
 England score their most points against Australia in Australia, surpassing the 39 points scored in the first test of this test series.
 Australia lose 3–0 for the first time since they lost their three-test series to South Africa in 1971.
 This was the first time three matches had been played in a series between England and Australia.

Statistics
Key
Con: Conversions
Pen: Penalties
DG: Drop goals
Pts: Points

England statistics

Test series statistics

See also
 2016 mid-year rugby union internationals
 History of rugby union matches between Australia and England

References

2016
Tour
2016 rugby union tours
2016 in Australian rugby union